Karen L. Thurman (born January 12, 1951) is a former U.S. Representative from Florida, serving five consecutive terms from 1993 to 2003. She is a Democrat.

Early life and education
She was born on January 12, 1951, in Rapid City, South Dakota, but has spent most of her life in Florida. She received her associate degree from Santa Fe College in Gainesville in 1970 and later her bachelor's degree in education from the University of Florida in Gainesville,  Florida in 1973. She is married to John Thurman. They have two children, McLin (Macky) and Liberty Lee, and make their home in Dunnellon, Florida.

Early political career

Thurman was first elected to public office in 1974, when she won a seat on the city council of Dunnellon, Florida, on which she served until 1983. She served as Mayor of Dunnellon from 1979 to 1981. She served in the Florida State Senate from 1983 to 1993.

Tenure in Congress

Florida gained three congressional districts after the 1990 census. One of them was the 5th District, which stretched from Gainesville to the far northern portion of the Tampa Bay Area. It was an open secret that this district was drawn for Thurman. She was elected to the House from that district in 1992 and was reelected four more times with no serious opposition.

Thurman was recognized as an expert on health, veterans, and tax issues. She was only the sixth woman to serve on the House Ways and Means Committee. On Ways and Means she fought for lower prescription drugs, increased access to health insurance, and tax relief. Prior to her appointment to Ways and Means in 1996, Congresswoman Thurman served on both the House Agriculture Committee and the Committee on Government Reform and Oversight.

After the 2000 census, the Republican-controlled Florida legislature reconfigured the 5th to make it friendlier to Republicans. She lost heavily Democratic Gainesville and surrounding Alachua County while picking up some heavily Republican territory between Tampa and Orlando. The new 5th contained much of the territory located in the State Senate district of that body's President Pro Tem, Ginny Brown-Waite. Nonetheless, Thurman ran for reelection. Even though the redrawn district had gone narrowly for George W. Bush in 2000 (Al Gore had won her old district handily), Thurman just barely lost to Brown-Waite. Since Thurman left office, the Democrats have cleared the 40 percent barrier in the district, now numbered as the 11th, only once.

Post-Congress career

In 2005 Thurman was elected Chairman of the Florida Democratic Party (FDP), succeeding Chairman Scott Maddox, who resigned in order to seek the Democratic nomination for governor. Thurman resigned on November 12, 2010, following the midterm elections.

Thurman is a member of the ReFormers Caucus of Issue One.

Personal
Her husband John Thurman was a Judge. She has two children; Macky and Liberty Thurman. She also has three grandchildren.

See also
 Women in the United States House of Representatives

References

External links
Official Florida Democratic Party profile
 

University of Florida College of Education alumni
Living people
1951 births
Democratic Party Florida state senators
Politicians from Rapid City, South Dakota
Female members of the United States House of Representatives
Mayors of places in Florida
Florida city council members
Women city councillors in Florida
Democratic Party members of the United States House of Representatives from Florida
Women state legislators in Florida
Women mayors of places in Florida
State political party chairs of Florida
2008 United States presidential electors
21st-century American politicians
21st-century American women politicians
People from Dunnellon, Florida
Members of Congress who became lobbyists